Bussière-Saint-Georges is a commune in the Creuse department in the Nouvelle-Aquitaine region in central France.

Geography
The commune borders the département of Indre.

Population

Sights
 The church of St. Georges, dating from the twelfth century.

See also
Communes of the Creuse department

References

Communes of Creuse